Tuvalu participated in the 2010 Summer Youth Olympics in Singapore.

Athletics

Note: The athletes who do not have a "Q" next to their Qualification Rank advance to a non-medal ranking final.

Boys
Track and Road Events

Badminton

Girls

References

Olympics
Nations at the 2010 Summer Youth Olympics
2010